The 7th congressional district of Illinois covers parts of Cook County, as of the 2023 redistricting that followed the 2020 census. All or parts of Broadview, Bellwood, Chicago, Forest Park, Hillside, Oak Park, La Grange Park, Maywood, and Westchester are included. Democrat Danny K. Davis has represented the district since January 1997. With a Cook Partisan Voting Index rating of D+37, it is the most Democratic district in Illinois.

Due to reapportionment every ten years, the 7th district like other districts has relocated in Illinois throughout its history. In the mid-1800s, Abraham Lincoln represented the 7th district before being elected president, although his home now lies within Illinois's 13th congressional district and most of his district's former territory is now located in the 18th district.

History 

In 1846, the 7th district was the only one in Illinois (among seven at the time) with a comfortably safe majority for the Whig Party. In the late 20th century, Chicago native Randy Kryn began his political career as the chairman of the 7th Congressional Republican Council and in 1986, he received greetings from the Soviet consulate in New York City.

Historical district boundaries

Recent statewide election results

Composition from 2023

As of the 2020 redistricting, this district will still be primarily based in Chicago's Central-South-West Side, as well as central Cook County.

The 7th district takes in the Chicago neighborhoods of the Loop, Armour Square, Fuller Park, Near West Side, East Garfield Park, West Garfield Park, North Lawndale, and West Englewood; most of Near South and Austin; half of Humboldt Park and Englewood; the coastal portion of Near North; part of West Town, Douglas, Grand Boulevard, and Chicago Lawn.

Outside the Chicago city limits, the 7th district takes in the Cook County communities of Oak Park, Westchester, Broadview, Bellwood, Maywood, and Forest Park; most of Hillside; and part of La Grange Park.

Elections

2012

2018

2020

2022

List of members representing the district

See also
Illinois's congressional districts
List of United States congressional districts

References

 Congressional Biographical Directory of the United States 1774–present

External links
Washington Post page on the 7th District of Illinois
U.S. Census Bureau - 7th District Fact Sheet

07
Congress-07
Constituencies established in 1843
1843 establishments in Illinois